The Ayagöz also spelled Ayaguz and Ayaköz, is a river of the Balkhash-Alakol Basin, Kazakhstan.

Geography
The Ayagöz is fed by snowmelt from the Tarbagatai Mountains and is used for irrigation, flowing into the eastern end of Lake Balkash, although there is no longer much flow from the river into the lake. The city of Ayagöz is located on its banks.

History
In 1717, Kaip Khan and Abul Khayr attacked the Dzungar Khanate but were defeated on the River Ayagöz.

Various Russian explorations took place in the area in the first half of the 19th century. Federoff explored the area in 1834. Between 1837 and 1843 the trans-Irtysh steppe as far as the Ayagöz River and Chu River was mapped on a scale of five versts to the inch. The shores of Lake Balkash were also surveyed and explored. Prince Gortchakoff, governor of Western Siberia, sent an officer named Assanoff in 1839 with some men to Lake Balkash to see if a fishing station could be established. He left Ayagöz and descended the river Ayagöz taking soundings, and fishing. He found two types of fish: marena and sudak, although not in large numbers, in the brackish water. The Kuzu Kerbetch tomb was found nearby and was said to be significant to the Kyrgyz population. Kuzu-Kerpetch was a Kyrgyz chief known from folk songs for valor and his love for Baian Sulu (who eventually caused his death)

Fauna
The river's reedy lower section was once tiger habitat.

References

External links
Panaramio image of east lake and river

Rivers of Kazakhstan
Tributaries of Lake Balkhash